Michael John Leslie Brown (born 27 September 1951) is a Welsh retired professional football centre back who played in the Football League for Brighton & Hove Albion and Brentford.

Career statistics

References

1951 births
Welsh footballers
English Football League players
Brentford F.C. players
Living people
Footballers from Swansea
Association football central defenders
Brighton & Hove Albion F.C. players
Crystal Palace F.C. players
Highlands Park F.C. players
Welsh expatriate sportspeople in South Africa
Welsh expatriate footballers
Expatriate soccer players in South Africa
National Football League (South Africa) players